Beyond the Sunset is a Blackmore's Night compilation album released in 2004 through Steamhammer. It is named after the song "Beyond the Sunset" by Blackmore’s Night from their 1999 album Under a Violet Moon. This compilation was derived from their four studio albums released at that point except for one previously unreleased track; "Once In A Million Years", and also contains two re-recorded tracks: "Ghost of a Rose" and "Now and Then".

The album won the New Age Reporter Lifestyle Music Award as the Best Vocal Album.

Track listing
Songs are by Ritchie Blackmore and Candice Night, except where noted.

Disc 1
 "Once in a Million Years" [Wenn aus Liebe Sehnsucht wird] – 4:33
 "Be Mine Tonight" – 2:55
 "Wish You Were Here" (Teijo) – 5:06
 "Waiting Just for You" (Blackmore, Clark, Night) – 3:18
 "Durch den Wald zum Bach Haus" (Blackmore) – 2:35 (instrumental)
 "Ghost of a Rose" – 5:43 (new version)
 "Spirit of the Sea" – 4:53
 "I Still Remember" – 5:42
 "Castles and Dreams" – 3:36
 "Beyond the Sunset" (Blackmore) – 3:47 (instrumental)
 "Again Someday" – 1:43
 "Diamonds and Rust" (Baez) – 4:54
 "Now and Then" (Night) – 3:15 (new version)
 "All Because of You" – 3:34

Disc 2
 "Written in the Stars" – 4:49
 "Morning Star" – 4:41
 "Play Minstrel Play" (trad., Blackmore, Night) – 3:59
 "Minstrel Hall" (Blackmore) – 2:36 (instrumental)
 "Under a Violet Moon" – 4:23

Disc 1; track 1 was previously unreleased.
Disc 1; tracks 2, 3, and 7; and Disc 2; tracks 3 and 4, are taken from Shadow of the Moon (1997).
Disc 1; tracks 5, 9, 10, and 13; and Disc 2; tracks 2 and 5, are taken from Under a Violet Moon (1999).
Disc 1; tracks 4, 8, 11, and 14; and Disc 2; track 1, are taken from Fires at Midnight (2001).
Disc 1; tracks 6 and 12 are taken from Ghost of a Rose (2003).

References

Blackmore's Night albums
2004 albums